"Better Than a Hallelujah" is a digital MP3 single released in 2010 (see 2010 in music) to promote Amy Grant's album Somewhere Down the Road, which was also released in 2010. The single for "Better Than a Hallelujah" was released to radio for airplay and additionally released commercially as a digital MP3, as the same version to appear on the album.  The radio single reached number 8 on the Christian charts.

Although not included on the single release, an "Ambient Mix" of the song was released digitally as a bonus track for the album Somewhere Down the Road on iTunes and other services.

In early 2011, "Better Than a Hallelujah" received a Grammy nomination for Best Gospel Song for songwriters Sarah Hart and Chapin Hartford.  However, it lost to "It's What I Do," written by Jerry Peters and Kirk Whalum and recorded by Whalum and Lalah Hathaway. The song also received a nomination for a Dove Award for Short Form Music Video of the Year at the 42nd GMA Dove Awards.

Music video
The music video was produced by Kip Kubin to promote the single.  It shows the story of an old man who discovers an old letter from his girlfriend, and goes back to her house to find that another family lives there.  He goes to public records to find her location at a cemetery.  At the grave, he opens the letter to find that she wrote that he was going to be a father, and drops it in the wind.  He recalls back to 1952 when he was in love with a girl, and had to leave, perhaps to war, without opening the letter - only to find the headstone reads "Judith Hanson and Infant."

The video proved to be a moving topic for netizens in China, according to the chinaSMACK blog.

Track listing
2010 Digital Single
"Better Than a Hallelujah" - 3:44

Remix EP released in 2014 in support of In Motion: The Remixes
"Better Than a Hallelujah" (featuring Mark Picchiotti) [Gospel Radio Edit] - 3:47
"Better Than a Hallelujah" (featuring Mark Picchiotti) [Gospel Club Mix] - 7:04
"Better Than a Hallelujah" (featuring Mark Picchiotti) [Revival Dub] - 7:17

Although there was an ambient mix (3:34) made of the song, it was not available on the single but was later released in 2011 as a track on the expanded edition of the album Somewhere Down the Road.

Official versions
 Album Version - 3:44
 Mark Picchiotti Gospel Club Mix - 7:07
 Mark Picchiotti Gospel Radio Edit - 3:47
 Mark Picchiotti Revival Dub - 7:18

References

Amy Grant songs
2010 singles
Songs written by Chapin Hartford
2010 songs
Sparrow Records singles
EMI Records singles
Song recordings produced by Dan Muckala